Trimethylsilyl chloride, also known as chlorotrimethylsilane is an organosilicon compound (silyl halide), with the formula (CH3)3SiCl, often abbreviated Me3SiCl or TMSCl.  It is a colourless volatile liquid that is stable in the absence of water. It is widely used in organic chemistry.

Preparation
TMSCl is prepared on a large scale by the direct process, the reaction of methyl chloride with a silicon-copper alloy.  The principal target of this process is dimethyldichlorosilane, but substantial amounts of the trimethyl and monomethyl products are also obtained. The relevant reactions are (Me = CH3):
 x MeCl + Si  →  Me3SiCl, Me2SiCl2, MeSiCl3, other products

Typically about 2–4% of the product stream is the monochloride, which forms an azeotrope with MeSiCl3.

Reactions and uses
TMSCl is reactive toward nucleophiles, resulting in the replacement of the chloride.  In a characteristic reaction of TMSCl, the nucleophile is water, resulting in hydrolysis to give the hexamethyldisiloxane:
2 Me3SiCl  +  H2O  →  Me3Si-O-SiMe3  +  2 HCl
The related reaction of trimethylsilyl chloride with alcohols can be exploited to produce anhydrous solutions of hydrochloric acid in alcohols, which find use in the mild synthesis of esters from carboxylic acids and nitriles as well as, acetals from ketones.  Similarly, trimethylsilyl chloride is also used to silanize laboratory glassware, making the surfaces more lipophilic.

Silylation in organic synthesis
By the process of silylation, polar functional groups such as alcohols and amines readily undergo reaction with trimethylsilyl chloride, giving trimethylsilyl ethers and trimethylsilyl amines. These new groups "protect" the original functional group by removing the labile protons and decreasing the basicity of the heteroatom.  The lability of the Me3Si-O and Me3Si-N groups can later be removed ("deprotected"). Trimethylsilylation can also be used to increase the volatility of a compound, enabling gas chromatography of normally nonvolatile substances such as glucose. 

Trimethylsilyl chloride also reacts with carbanions to give trimethylsilyl derivatives. Lithium acetylides react to give trimethylsilylalkynes such as bis(trimethylsilyl)acetylene. Such derivatives are useful protected forms of alkynes.

In the presence of triethylamine and lithium diisopropylamide, enolisable aldehydes, ketones and esters are converted to trimethylsilyl enol ethers. Despite their hydrolytic instability, these compounds have found wide application in organic chemistry; oxidation  of the double bond by epoxidation or dihydroxylation can be used to return the original carbonyl group with an alcohol group at the alpha carbon. The trimethylsilyl enol ethers can also be used as masked enolate equivalents in the Mukaiyama aldol addition.

Dehydrations
Dehydration of metal chlorides with trimethylsilyl chloride in THF gives the solvate as illustrated by the case of chromium trichloride:
CrCl3  +  12 Me3SiCl   →   CrCl3(THF)3  +  6 (Me3Si)2O  +  12 HCl

Other reactions
Trimethylsilyl chloride is used to prepare other trimethylsilyl halides and pseudohalides, including trimethylsilyl fluoride, trimethylsilyl bromide, trimethylsilyl iodide,  trimethylsilyl cyanide, trimethylsilyl azide, and trimethylsilyl trifluoromethanesulfonate (TMSOTf). These compounds are produced by a salt metathesis reaction between trimethylsilyl chloride and a salt of the (pseudo)halide (MX):
MX + Me3Si-Cl → MCl + Me3Si-X
TMSCl, lithium, and nitrogen molecule react to give tris(trimethylsilyl)amine, under catalysis by nichrome wire or chromium trichloride:
3 Me3SiCl  +  3 Li  +     →  (Me3Si)3N  +  3 LiCl
Using this approach, atmospheric nitrogen can be introduced into organic substrate. For example, tris(trimethylsilyl)amine reacts with α,δ,ω-triketones to give tricyclic pyrroles.

Reduction of trimethylsilyl chloride give hexamethyldisilane:
2 Me3SiCl  +  2 Na   →  2 NaCl  +  Me3Si-SiMe3

References

Reagents for organic chemistry
Trimethylsilyl compounds
Chlorosilanes